Teloga is an unincorporated community in Chattooga County, in the U.S. state of Georgia.

History
The community takes its name from nearby Teloga Creek. A variant name is "Teloga Springs". The Teloga post office closed in 1927.

References

Unincorporated communities in Georgia (U.S. state)
Unincorporated communities in Chattooga County, Georgia